The Robert Trent Jones Golf Trail is a collection of championship caliber golf courses, designed by Robert Trent Jones, Sr., distributed across the state of Alabama, as part of investments by the Retirement Systems of Alabama.  The Trail started with 378 holes at eight sites throughout the state, but has grown to 468 holes at eleven sites.  

The concept was created and executed by David G. Bronner, CEO of the Retirement Systems of Alabama.  The mission was to effectively diversify the assets of the state's pension fund and economically help the state of Alabama, the philosophy being that "the stronger the Retirement Systems of Alabama can make Alabama, the stronger the Retirement Systems will be."

LPGA Tour
Two of the courses currently host events on the LPGA Tour: The Senator course at Capitol Hill near Montgomery, which hosts the Yokohama Tire LPGA Classic, and The Crossings course at Magnolia Grove near Mobile, home to the Airbus LPGA Classic.

PGA Tour
The Grand National course in Opelika hosted the first PGA Tour event in Alabama since the 1990 PGA Championship, the 2015 Barbasol Championship.

Courses and locations
 Cambrian Ridge (Greenville)
 Canyon (9 holes)
 Sherling (9 holes)
 Loblolly (9 holes)
 Short Course (9 holes)
 Played as Canyon/Loblolly, Loblolly/Sherling, or Sherling/Canyon.
 Capitol Hill (Prattville/Montgomery)
 Judge
 Legislator
 Senator
 Grand National (Auburn/Opelika)
 Lake
 Links
 Short Course
 Hampton Cove (Huntsville)
 Highlands
 River
 Short Course
 Highland Oaks (Dothan)
 Highlands (9 holes)
 Marshwood (9 holes)
 Magnolia (9 holes)
 Short Course (9 holes)
 Played as Highlands/Marshwood, Magnolia/Highlands, or Marshwood/Magnolia.
 Lakewood Golf Club (Point Clear)
 Azalea
 Dogwood
 Magnolia Grove (Mobile)
 Crossings
 Falls
 Short Course
 Oxmoor Valley (Birmingham)
 Ridge
 Valley
 Short Course
 Ross Bridge (Hoover/Birmingham)
 Silver Lakes (Gadsden/Anniston)
 Backbreaker (9 holes)
 Heartbreaker (9 holes)
 Mindbreaker (9 holes)
 Short Course (9 holes)
 Played as Backbreaker/Mindbreaker, Heartbreaker/Backbreaker, or Mindbreaker/Heartbreaker.
 The Shoals (Muscle Shoals/Florence)
 Fighting Joe
 Schoolmaster

Scorecards
Scorecards for courses played on the PGA and LPGA Tours.

References

External links
 Official site
 Robert Trent Jones Golf Trail article in the Encyclopedia of Alabama

Golf clubs and courses designed by Robert Trent Jones
Landmarks in Alabama
Golf clubs and courses in Alabama
Sports venues in Alabama